The  or  is a small fjord that branches off of the main Kvænangen fjord in Kvænangen Municipality in Troms og Finnmark county, Norway. Other settlements along the fjord include Undereidet on the north side and Sekkemo on the south side. West of Nordnes lies the Sørstraumen strait near the village of Sørstraumen, where European Route E6 crosses the Sørstraumen Bridge over the Kvænangen fjord. European Route E6 then continues along the south and east sides of the Badderfjord.

See also
 List of Norwegian fjords

References

External links
 Badderfjord at Norgeskart
 Badderfjord at FINN kart

Fjords of Troms og Finnmark
Kvænangen